Brasilodendron was a genus of lycophytes dating from the Permian. Plants were vascularized with reproduction by spores.

Location
Fossils of Brasilodendron are found in the Rio Bonito Formation in southern Brazil. The species Brasilodendron cf. pedroanum was found in Encruzilhada do Sul and Mariana Pimentel. The species Brasilodendron africanum was found in Africa in Namibia.

References

Prehistoric lycophytes
Prehistoric lycophyte genera
Permian plants